Yellowstone National Forest was first established by the General Land Office on March 30, 1891 as the Yellowstone Park Timber Land Reserve of .

The reserve was first suggested by General Philip Sheridan in 1882 after a visit to Yellowstone National Park. Legislation was introduced by Senator George Graham Vest to accomplish this, but it was stalled by local opposition. The American Forestry Association took up the cause, preparing legislation that would allow the United States president to set aside lands as "forest reservations" through an executive order. President Benjamin Harrison then proclaimed the reserve, largely following Sheridan's recommendation, on March 30, 1891. Some areas on the northeast portion of the proposed reservation were excluded to allow mining in the headwaters of the Clarks Fork River. The land was, in effect, the first national forest. For the time being, it was placed under the same military administration that applied to Yellowstone Park proper.

In 1902 lands were exchanged with the Teton Forest Reserve and the reserve was placed under civilian administration, with the first ranger station in the nation established at Wapiti on the Shoshone River.  Artist and rancher Abraham Archibald Anderson was named as the first Special Superintendent of Forest Reserves.  

On January 9, 1903 lands of the first Absaroka and Teton Forest Reserves were added, and on March 4, 1907 it became Yellowstone National Forest.  In 1905 all federal forests were transferred to the U.S. Forest Service. On July 1, 1908 as part of a major reorganization, the forest was divided into Targhee, Teton, Wyoming, Bonneville, Absaroka, Shoshone and Beartooth National Forests, and the name was discontinued.

References

External links
Forest History Society
Listing of the National Forests of the United States and Their Dates (from the Forest History Society website) Text from Davis, Richard C., ed. Encyclopedia of American Forest and Conservation History. New York: Macmillan Publishing Company for the Forest History Society, 1983. Vol. II, pp. 743-788.

Former National Forests of Wyoming
Greater Yellowstone Ecosystem